Carry On, Sergeant! is a 1928 Canadian World War I drama, and is considered to be one of the earliest Canadian feature-length motion pictures. Costing half-a-million to make, it certainly was the most expensive.

Plot 
Carry On, Sergeant! is the story of four friends who join the army to fight in the First World War. After years of trench warfare, one of the men (Hugh Buckler) meets a French woman (Louise Cardi) working the taverns. He sleeps with her, but is overcome with guilt and is later killed in battle. His wife (Nancy Ann Hargreaves) back home believes he died a hero and remembers him with love. This sentimental film, which doesn't back away from the unpleasant – it was harshly criticized for the affair between a Canadian soldier and a 'prostitute' – was released at the end of the silent era and after only a brief theatrical run it disappeared from view. It was revived in the 1970s when the National Archives of Canada struck a new print.

Release
The film premiered on 10 November 1928, in the Regent Theatre in Toronto.

References

Works cited

External links
 
 
 Restored copy at YouTube provided by Library and Archives Canada under its French name Bibliothèque et Archives Canada.

1928 films
1920s war drama films
Canadian black-and-white films
Canadian Armed Forces in films
Canadian war drama films
Canadian World War I films
Canadian silent feature films
1928 drama films
1920s Canadian films
Silent war drama films
1920s English-language films